Brookfield is a city in Linn County, Missouri, United States. The population was 4,111 at the 2020 census.

History
Brookfield was surveyed in 1859 by John Wood Brooks, a native of Boston. John Wood Brooks is further remembered by the names of four Brookfield streets: John, Wood, Brooks, and Boston streets. A post office called Brookfield has been in operation since 1860.

Geography
Brookfield is located at  (39.783155, -93.073871).

Demographics

2010 census
As of the census of 2010, there were 4,542 people, 1,892 households, and 1,146 families living in the city. The racial makeup of the city was 95.4% White, 1.3% African American, 0.3% Native American, 0.3% Asian, 0.6% from other races, and 2.1% from two or more races. Hispanic or Latino of any race were 2.0% of the population.

There were 1,892 households, of which 30.8% had children under the age of 18 living with them, 43.3% were married couples living together, 12.5% had a female householder with no husband present, 4.7% had a male householder with no wife present, and 39.4% were non-families. 34.5% of all households were made up of individuals, and 16.4% had someone living alone who was 65 years of age or older. The average household size was 2.32 and the average family size was 2.96.

The median age in the city was 40.6 years. 25.8% of residents were under the age of 18; 7.1% were between the ages of 18 and 24; 21.6% were from 25 to 44; 25.1% were from 45 to 64; and 20.5% were 65 years of age or older. The gender makeup of the city was 45.9% male and 54.1% female.

2000 census
As of the census of 2000, there were 4,769 people, 2,058 households, and 1,234 families living in the city. The population density was 1,110.2 people per square mile (428.2/km). There were 2,394 housing units at an average density of 557.3/sq mi (215.0/km). The racial makeup of the city was 96.94% White, 1.26% African American, 0.36% Native American, 0.15% Asian, 0.13% from other races, and 1.17% from two or more races. Hispanic or Latino of any race were 0.94% of the population.

There were 2,058 households, out of which 27.2% had children under the age of 18 living with them, 44.8% were married couples living together, 11.4% had a female householder with no husband present, and 40.0% were non-families. 35.3% of all households were made up of individuals, and 20.7% had someone living alone who was 65 years of age or older. The average household size was 2.23 and the average family size was 2.86.

In the city, the population was spread out, with 24.1% under the age of 18, 7.2% from 18 to 24, 23.1% from 25 to 44, 20.8% from 45 to 64, and 24.9% who were 65 years of age or older. The median age was 42 years. For every 100 females, there were 83.4 males. For every 100 females age 18 and over, there were 77.9 males.

The median income for a household in the city was $25,753, and the median income for a family was $32,385. Males had a median income of $23,284 versus $19,004 for females. The per capita income for the city was $14,842. About 14.7% of families and 19.1% of the population were below the poverty line, including 28.7% of those under age 18 and 14.8% of those age 65 or over.

Education
Brookfield R-III School District operates one elementary school, one middle school, Brookfield High School, and Brookfield Area Career Center.

The town has a lending library, the Brookfield Public Library.

Media

Newspapers
 Linn County Leader

Radio
 KFMZ 1470, AM
 KZBK 96.9, FM

Arts and culture 

Every Labor Day weekend, Brookfield hosts the Great Pershing Balloon Derby.
Every fall the Brookfield Bulldogs play the Marceline Tigers in the annual Bell Game which is one of the oldest high school football rivalries in the United States. The Bell Game won a USA Today national contest for the nations best football rivalry in 2012. The Bell Game rivalry received 1,761,878 votes and won a $10,000 prize divided equally between Brookfield and Marceline.

Every year Brookfield hosts Twin Parks Summer Festival, a festival that takes place in the Twin Parks and on Main Street. The Twin Parks Summer Festival marks the start of summer for families in and around Brookfield, with activities including craft vendors, a baby contest, games, and a concert on Main Street featuring prominent acts.

Notable people 
 Nellie Showalter, an early women's chess champion, was born in Brookfield in 1870.
 Don Pratt, the highest-ranking Allied officer killed on D-Day, was born in Brookfield in 1892.
 Dorothy C. Stratton, the first woman to be commissioned an officer in U.S. Coast Guard, was born in Brookfield in 1899.
 Howard A. Rusk, prominent physician and founder of the Rusk Institute of Rehabilitation Medicine, was born in Brookfield in 1901.
 Virgil Blossom, Superintendent of Schools of the Little Rock School District during the Little Rock Nine, was born in Brookfield in 1906.
 Jeff Roe, Republican political consultant, was born in Brookfield in 1970 and lived there until joining the Army at age 16.

 Doris Akers, gospel singer and composer, was born in Brookfield and resided there until age five.  Akers, an African-American, was inducted into the Gospel Music Hall of Fame in 2001, and the Southern Gospel Music Hall of Fame in 2011.

Punk rock band All lived in Brookfield from 1990 to 1994, when they released their albums Percolater (1992) and Breaking Things (1993).

References

External links
 City of Brookfield
 Historic maps of Brookfield in the Sanborn Maps of Missouri Collection at the University of Missouri

Cities in Linn County, Missouri
Cities in Missouri